The Wyckoff-Bennett-Mont Homestead in Flatlands, Brooklyn, New York City, is a National Historic Landmark.  It is believed to have been built before 1766.  During the American Revolution, it housed Hessian soldiers, two of whom, Captain Toepfer of the Ditfourth regiment and Lieut. M. Bach of the Hessen-Hanau Artillerie, scratched their names and units into windowpanes. It was declared a National Historic Landmark in 1976. It is part of the New York State Revolutionary War Heritage Trail.

According to an embroidered needlepoint artwork currently on display in the main home building, it was owned and occupied by the Wyckoff Family from 1776 to 1835.  The Bennett family owned and occupied it from 1835 to 1983, and the Mont family has owned and occupied it since 1983. The property is one of the last privately owned Dutch Colonial houses in New York City.  Starting  2000 the City of New York planned to buy the house and land from its present owners, Annette and Stuart Mont, who would have remained on the property rent-free but those plans fell through. In July 2020, when it was placed for sale for $3.2 million, the Brownstoner blog reported that only three families had lived on the property in its history: the Wyckoff, Bennett, and Mont families.

A plaque outside the homestead says:This Dutch-American farmhouse is a quiet reminder that the Battle of Brooklyn, one of the biggest conflicts of the Revolutionary War, took place when Kings County was still mostly farm country. The county boasted fewer than 4,000 inhabitants, one third of whom were slaves working on and owned by families descended from 17th-century Dutch immigrants. Hendrick Wyckoff built the house in 1766. The site he chose lay along Kings Highway, then the county's main east-west artery. After the British invasion in 1776, Hessian soldiers were quartered here. Several of them left their mark by etching their names and rank on window panes among them Toepfer Captain Regt. De Ditrurth and "M. Bach Lieutenant V. Hessen Hanau Artillerie's". When the Battle of Brooklyn began on August 27, 1776, these men may well have taken part in the attack that drove American defenders from the Battle Pass, in what is now Prospect Park, and nearly destroyed the army under command of George Washington.

On October 14, 2021,the entire property was sold for $2.4 million dollars to "22nd Street Investors" according to City records

See also
Wyckoff House, another historic house in Brooklyn
Oldest buildings in America
List of National Historic Landmarks in New York City
National Register of Historic Places listings in Brooklyn

References

External links

 Brooklyn Genealogical Information page on Wyckoff-Bennett Homestead
 Historical Marker Database Wyckoff Bennett Mont House Revolutionary War Heritage Trail

Houses on the National Register of Historic Places in Brooklyn
National Historic Landmarks in New York City
Houses completed in 1766
Flatlands, Brooklyn